Ada Rogovtseva (born 16 July 1937) is a Ukrainian-Soviet actress. She has appeared in over 30 films and television shows since 1957. Professor at the National University of Culture. She won the award for Best Actress at the 7th Moscow International Film Festival for her role in Hail, Mary!

Biography 

Born in the Glukhіv Chernihiv region of the Ukrainian SSR (1939, the Glukhov district was transferred to the Sumy region). Father, Mykola Ivanovich Rogovtsev, had two higher education, graduating from the industrial and agricultural institutions, until the war worked in the NKVD. Mother, Anna Mitrofanivna Zakovskaya, specialty Agronom.

She is the members of the Committee on the National Prize of Ukraine named after Taras Shevchenko (December 2016).

Selected filmography
 Pavel Korchagin (1956)
 Forest Song (1961)
 Hail, Mary! (1970)
 Taming of the Fire (1972)
 Eternal Call (1973-1983)
 Waves of the Black Sea (1975)
 The Sea (1978)
 The Gadfly (1980)
 Nine Lives of Nestor Makhno (2006)
 Admiral (2008)
 Taras Bulba (2009)
 11 children from Morshyn (2019)

Accolades
 People's Artist of the USSR
 People's Artist of Ukraine
 Order of Princess Olga (Third Class, 2002)
 Order of Merit (First Class, 2009)
 Order of Merit (Third Class, 1997)

References

External links

1937 births
Living people
Ukrainian film actresses
Soviet film actresses
People from Hlukhiv
Recipients of the Shevchenko National Prize
Recipients of the Order of State
Recipients of the Order of Merit (Ukraine), 1st class
Recipients of the Order of Merit (Ukraine), 2nd class
Recipients of the Order of Merit (Ukraine), 3rd class
Recipients of the Order of Princess Olga, 3rd class
Laureates of the Oleksandr Dovzhenko State Prize